True Crime with Aphrodite Jones was an American documentary television series airing on Investigation Discovery, hosted by Aphrodite Jones. The show was very similar in format to On the Case with Paula Zahn. Jones presents her take on crimes, often accompanied with footage, evidence and interviews.

Episodes

Season 1 (2010)

Season 2 (2011)

Season 3 (2013)

Season 4 (2013-14)

Season 5 (2015)

Season 6 (2016)

References

2010s American documentary television series
2010 American television series debuts
English-language television shows
Investigation Discovery original programming
Documentary television series about crime in the United States
2016 American television series endings